Joseph George John Hopkins (19 February 1902 – 23 October 1974) was a British racewalker. He competed in the men's 50 kilometres walk at the 1936 Summer Olympics.

References

1902 births
1974 deaths
Athletes (track and field) at the 1936 Summer Olympics
British male racewalkers
Olympic athletes of Great Britain
Place of birth missing